Taman Mount Austin, is a residential area in Johor Bahru, Johor, Malaysia. The neighborhood has a mix of various properties, from terrace homes, semi-detached homes, service apartments, industrial buildings to shop-office lots. It is a famous area of Johor Bahru renowned for having many restaurants and over 30 bubble tea shops. It is located in between Taman Setia Indah and Taman Daya.

Residential Estates
Austin Heights (和麗園)
Austin Residences
Taman Mount Austin Perdana

Education
Austin Heights School
Sunway College JB
SJK (C) Foon Yew 5
SJK (T) Ladang Mount Austin

Tourism Attractions
 Austin Heights Water Park
 Mount Austin Sports Stadium

Transportation
Taman Mount Austin can be reached via the Pasir Gudang Highway or the Jalan Pandan federal route. These road networks are also connected to the North–South Expressway (Malaysia)(NSE). Note that there is a new roundabout added in the area, which may have heavy jams during peak hours.

References

Johor Bahru
Entertainment districts in Malaysia
Towns and suburbs in Johor Bahru District